Mark Levene is a historian and emeritus fellow at University of Southampton.

Levene's work and research focuses on genocide, Jewish history and anthropogenic climate change.

His book The Crisis of Genocide: The European Rimlands, 1912-1953 received the biennial Lemkin Award from the New York-based Institute for the Study of Genocide in 2015.

In 2015, Dr. Peter Hilpold, a Professor at the University of Innsbruck reviewed the book. He stated that the book makes a valuable contribution, although the study's foundational assumptions are questioned. Levene does not use the same definition of genocide as found in the UN Genocide Convention.

The Balfour Declaration - a case of mistaken identity 
In this 1992 essay, Levene followed the people behind the Balfour declaration which during the First World War gave birth to the British Mandate of Palestine and to what later became the state of Israel. 

According to him, historians were perplexed about the reasons behind the declaration, or they were simply getting it wrong. He wrote:
"Barbara Tuchman in all seriousness proposed that 'the English Bible was the  most important single factor'."

Levene discovered that an anti-Zionist Jew, Lucien Wolf, had actually proposed the idea to the then clearly anti-semitic British Foreign ministry and that it was accepted precisely because of that, with the British believing that supporting the Zionists would bring "World Jewry" and especially the Jews in the United States to side with Britain and actively enter the war against Germany (and Turkey who ruled Palestine at the time). Later on, Wolf backed off, and when the declaration was realized, other considerations came into play.

Works

References

Living people
Academics of the University of Southampton
Year of birth missing (living people)
20th-century British historians
21st-century British historians
Genocide studies scholars